Kawanabe Dam is a dam in Kagoshima Prefecture, Japan, completed in 2002.

References 

Dams in Kagoshima Prefecture
Dams completed in 2002
2002 establishments in Japan